Kolster may refer to:

 Clarence Kolster (1895–1972), American film editor
 Frederick A. Kolster (1883–1950), American engineer
 Kolster-Brandes
 Kolster Radio Corporation